is a city located in eastern Shizuoka Prefecture, Japan.

Geography
Mishima is located in far eastern Shizuoka Prefecture, at the northern end of Izu Peninsula and in the foothills of Mount Fuji.

Surrounding municipalities
Shizuoka Prefecture
Numazu
Susono
Kannami
Shimizu
Nagaizumi
Kanagawa Prefecture
Hakone

Demographics
Per Japanese census data, the population of Mishima has remained stable over the past 25 years.

Climate
Mishima has a humid subtropical climate (Köppen climate classification Cfa) with hot summers and cool winters. Precipitation is significant throughout the year, but is heaviest from June to September.

History 
Under the Ritsuryō administration system established in the Nara period, Mishima was made capital of Izu Province. It was also the location of the Kokubun-ji for Izu Province. In the Edo period, Mishima prospered from its location on the Tōkaidō highway connecting Edo with Kyoto, and Mishima-shuku was one of the 53 post stations on that road. The area was tenryō territory ruled by a daikan appointed directly by the Tokugawa shogunate. After the Meiji Restoration, Mishima became part of the short-lived Nirayama Prefecture in 1868. This merged with the equally short-lived Ashigara Prefecture in 1871, and became part of Shizuoka Prefecture from 18 April 1876. With the establishment of the modern municipalities system of 1889, the area was reorganized as Mishima Town within Kimisawa District. In 1892, Prince Komatsu Akihito established a villa in Mishima. Its gardens, the Rakujūen, are a noted visitor attraction in Mishima to this day. In 1896, Kimisawa District became part of Tagata District, Shizuoka. Mishima received its first train connection in 1898 when the predecessor of the Izuhakone Railway established what is now Shimo-Togari Station. The Sunzu Line began operations from 1906. However, Mishima's fortunes revived strongly only after the Tanna Tunnel was completed in 1934, connecting the town to the Tōkaidō Main Line railway between Tokyo and Shizuoka. Mishima developed rapidly afterwards, merging with neighboring Kitakami Village in 1935 and Watada Village in 1941. Mishima Town was elevated in status to a city on 29 April 1941. It became a stop on the Tōkaidō Shinkansen from 1969, leading to an expansion in population, as the line made it possible to commute to Tokyo.

Government
Mishima has a mayor-council form of government with a directly elected mayor and a unicameral city legislature of 22 members. The city contributes two members to the Shizuoka Prefectural Assembly.

Economy
Mishima is a major industrial center within Shizuoka Prefecture. In addition to a railroad repair facility operated by JR Central, the city hosts factories from:
 Toray
 DMW Corporation
 Toshiba TEC Corporation
 Yokohama Rubber Company
 CFS Corporation (HAC Drugstores)
 Izuhakone Railway Company Ltd

Education
Mishima has 14 public elementary schools, and seven public middle schools operated by the city government and three public high schools operated by the Shizuoka Prefectural Board of Education. There are one private junior high school and two private high schools. In addition, Juntendo University and the Graduate University for Advanced Studies each have a facility at Mishima. The College of International Relations for Nihon University is located in Mishima. A former private junior college, Fujimigaoka Women's Junior College, was operating between 1966 and 2009.

Sister City relations 
  Pasadena, California, United States, since 24 July 1957
  New Plymouth, New Zealand, since 29 April 1991
  Lishui, Zhejiang, China, since 12 May 1997

Transport

Railway 
 Central Japan Railway Company – Tōkaidō Shinkansen
 
 Central Japan Railway Company – Tōkaidō Main Line
 Mishima Station
 Izuhakone Railway – Sunzu Line
 Mishima –  –  –  –

Highways 
  Tōmei Expressway
  Shin-Tōmei Expressway
  Izu-Jūkan Expressway

Government facilities
Mishima is home to the National Institute of Genetics.

Local attractions
Mishima Taisha
Ryūtaku-ji Rinzai Zen temple
Izu Kokubun-ji ruins, A National Historic Site
Yamanaka Castle ruins, A National Historic Site
Sano Art Museum
Rakuju-en Gardens
 The Mishima Summer Festival takes place from 15 to 17 August every year

Notable people from Mishima
EVIL (Real Name: Takaaki Watanabe, Nihongo: 渡辺 高章, Watanabe Takaaki), Japanese professional wrestler
Sagatsukasa Hiroyuki (Real Name: Hiroyuki Isobe, Nihongo: 磯部 洋之, Isobe Hiroyuki), sumo wrestler
Makoto Ōoka, poet and literary critic
Yukiko Sakamoto, Japanese politician
Nobuyoshi Sano, composer and musician
Naohiro Takahara, professional soccer player (Okinawa SV, Kyushu Soccer League)
Yoshiaki Koizumi, videogame designer, director and producer
Tsutomu Kouno, videogame designer
Tomomi Takahashi, baseball player (Saitama Seibu Lions, Nippon Professional Baseball – Pacific League)
Kyohei Uchida, professional soccer player (AC Nagano Parceiro, J3 League)
Michi Takahashi, teddy bear artist
Kazuma Suzuki, Japanese stage, film, television actor, film director, fashion designer, and former model
Mirai Aoshima, Japanese professional shogi player ranked 6-dan and chess master (FIDE Master)
Shohei Matsunaga, former professional soccer player (attacking midfielder)
Hikari Takagi, professional soccer player (Nojima Stella Kanagawa Sagamihara, Nadeshiko League and the Japan national football team)
Hiroshi Takano, Japanese singer, composer, lyricist, music arranger, guitarist and producer

References

External links

 

 
Cities in Shizuoka Prefecture